French Pass (officially Te Aumiti / French Pass) is a narrow and treacherous stretch of water that separates D'Urville Island, at the north end of the South Island of New Zealand, from the mainland coast. At one end is Tasman Bay, and at the other end the outer Pelorus Sound / Te Hoiere leads out to Cook Strait.

French Pass has the fastest tidal flows in New Zealand, reaching 8 knots (4 m/s). When the tide changes, the current can be strong enough to stun fish.

The local tribes are Ngāti Koata and Ngāti Kuia.

History
In the oral tradition of some Māori tribes, Te Aumiti (French Pass) is the resting place of Kupe's pet king shag, called Te Kawau-a-Toru. Kupe was a pioneer Polynesian navigator who discovered Cook Strait in his canoe. While he was exploring Cook Strait, Kupe was attacked by a giant octopus. In the furious battle to kill the octopus, the coast was gouged into the convoluted shapes that today make up the Sounds. Kupe's loyal shag then led Kupe to the French Pass passage, and explored the area on Kupe's behalf. Te Kawau-a-Toru had a huge wingspan, and was reputed to be a sacred bird with "the eye of the ancestor", insight into ancient knowledge. However, while testing the channel to see if it was safe for Kupe's canoe, Te Kawau-a-Toru got caught in the tidal rip, broke a wing and drowned. The broken reef adjacent to the channel is Kupe's loyal bird turned to stone – Te Aumiti a te Kawau-a-Toru (the currents that swallowed Toru's shag). A nearby rocky point where a lighthouse now stands is the bird's petrified bones.

The first recorded European navigation of the pass occurred in 1827. Admiral Jules Dumont d'Urville navigated the pass during his second voyage to New Zealand, in the French Navy corvette Astrolabe. Approaching the narrowest part of the pass, the vessel swung sideward and did not respond to steerage. The corvette struck rocks twice, and was then washed over the reef and into Admiralty Bay. The high energy and complexity of the location was summed up by d'Urville suggesting that no one should attempt to navigate French Pass except in extreme emergency.

In 1888, a Risso's dolphin appeared in the area. For the next 24 years, this dolphin accompanied boats to and from French Pass. He became famous as Pelorus Jack and was the first dolphin in the world to receive the protection of the law. Pelorus Jack stayed in the Pelorus Sounds, and did not navigate the pass into Tasman Bay. Then he would join boats returning to Nelson at the entrance to Pelorus Sound / Te Hoiere and escort them back to the pass. Pelorus Jack was last seen in April 1912. The lightkeeper at French Pass claimed he found the body of Pelorus Jack decomposing on the shore.

In August 2014, the name of French Pass was officially altered to Te Aumiti / French Pass.

Tidal flows

Most of the rest of the pass is broken reef.

This can result in substantial pressure gradients across the pass, complicated by a phase or time difference of about 25 minutes between the high tides on either side.

Near to the pass are deep holes where strong vertical flows can occur. In 2000, student divers taking part in a drift dive during the local ebb flow were separated from their surface float and caught in a whirlpool. The depth of this descent resulted in multiple fatalities. The group appears to have been drawn deep into the hole and then returned to the surface again. According to the coroner's report, the accident occurred on a falling tide, so the current was flowing from the south west to the north east.

French Pass / Anaru 
French Pass / Anaru is an unofficial name for the settlement south of French Pass, which has been in use since at least 1980. It was formerly Anaru. There is a short walk to a lookout overlooking the channel and a campground, with a boat ramp and jetty.

Notes

References
 Baldwin O (1979) The story of New Zealand’s French Pass and d’Urville Island. Fields Publishing House, Plimmerton.
 Stevens C and Sutton P (2007) Measuring Tidal Currents near Cook Strait ADCP Flow
 Stevens C, Sutton P, Smith and Dickson R (2008) Tidal flows in Te Aumiti (French Pass), South Island, New Zealand NZ Journal of Marine and Freshwater Research.

External links
 Te Aumiti (French Pass) Tidal Stream  - Land Information new Zealand
 McNab, Robert (1909) Murihiku: A History of the South Island of New Zealand and the Islands Adjacent and Lying to the South, from 1642 to 1835: Chapter 26: Discovery of the French Pass, 1827 Whitcomb & Tombs, Wellington.

Straits of New Zealand
Marlborough Sounds
Populated places in the Marlborough Sounds
Tasman Bay